The Bottomley map projection is a pseudoconical equal area map projection defined as:

where

and φ is the latitude, λ is the longitude from the central meridian, and φ1 is the given parallel of the projection which determines its shape, all in radians.

The inverse projection is then given by:

where

Parallels (i.e. lines of latitude) are concentric elliptical arcs of constant eccentricity equal to cos φ1, centred on the north pole.  On the central meridian, shapes are not distorted, but elsewhere they are. Different projections can be produced by altering the eccentricity of the arcs, making it vary between the sinusoidal projection and the Werner projection.  For larger values of φ1, it produces a heart shape. 

It was introduced by Henry Bottomley as an alternative to the Bonne projection to reduce the extent of extreme distortion at the edges and give a more satisfying overall shape.

See also
 List of map projections

References

External links

Cybergeo article: Between the Sinusoidal projection and the Werner: an alternative to the Bonne (Une alternative à la projection cartographique de Bonne), Henry Bottomley, 2003

Map projections
Equal-area projections